The San Giovanni in Corte Baptistery, also known as the Baptistery of San Giovanni di Rotondo, is a former Roman Catholic building in Pistoia, region of Tuscany, Italy. The octagonal baptistery stands at a slight angle across a small piazza from the Duomo of Pistoia in the center of town. It is presently used for cultural events.

Description
A likely centralized Lombard-era church of Santa Maria in Corte in front of the cathedral is mentioned in documents from 1114 and was likely the site of this baptistery. The decision to build this mainly Gothic-style building was made in 1303. The exterior sheath banded with marble of two colors was completed circa 1339 by Cellino di Nese. Construction lasted many decades. The baptismal font is large and circular and contained in a block with four smaller circular basins; the floral panels were sculpted in 1226 by Lanfranco da Como. The portal has some bas-reliefs and sculptures (John the Baptist, Virgin and child, and St Peter) in the architrave by a sculptor working in the style of Giovanni d'Agostino. A sculpture of St John the Baptist by Andrea Vacca is housed inside.

The baptistery has a pulpit facing outside to the piazza. The steep roof of the dome creates a pyramidal profile with a lantern covering oculus at apex.

See also
 History of medieval Arabic and Western European domes

References

Buildings and structures completed in 1361
14th-century Roman Catholic church buildings in Italy
Octagonal churches in Italy
Catholic baptisteries
Baptistery
Gothic architecture in Pistoia
Baptisteries in Italy